The shear-tailed grey tyrant (Muscipipra vetula) is a species of bird in the family Tyrannidae, in the monotypic genus Muscipipra. It is found in southeastern Brazil, eastern Paraguay and far northeastern Argentina, where its natural habitats are subtropical or tropical moist lowland forest, subtropical or tropical moist montane forest, and heavily degraded former forest.

References

shear-tailed grey tyrant
Birds of the Atlantic Forest
shear-tailed grey tyrant
Taxonomy articles created by Polbot